Edward Elgar's Violin Concerto was first recorded complete in 1929. Truncated versions had been recorded in 1916 using the acoustic recording process, the technical limitations of which necessitated drastic rearrangement of the score. Electrical recording, introduced in the 1920s, gave a greatly improved dynamic range and realism, and the two leading English record companies, Columbia and His Master's Voice (HMV) both made recordings of the concerto that remain in the catalogue. The first was made for Columbia by Albert Sammons with the New Queen's Hall Orchestra conducted by Sir Henry Wood. Elgar's own recording with the young Yehudi Menuhin followed three years later. Since then there have been more than twenty-five further recordings, featuring British and international performers.

Recordings by date

Critical opinion
The BBC Radio 3 feature "Building a Library" has presented comparative reviews of all available versions of the concerto on three occasions, and recommended as follows:

15 October 1994, reviewer, Michael Kennedy:
Kyoko Takezawa, Bavarian Radio Symphony Orchestra, Sir Colin Davis
Yehudi Menuhin, London Symphony Orchestra,  Sir Edward Elgar
10 July 1999, reviewer, Iain Burnside:
Albert Sammons, New Queen's Hall Orchestra, Sir Henry Wood
Pinchas Zukerman London Philharmonic Orchestra, Daniel Barenboim
14 January 2012, reviewer, Martin Cotton:
Yehudi Menuhin, London Symphony Orchestra, Sir Edward Elgar
Thomas Zehetmair, Hallé Orchestra, Sir Mark Elder

The Penguin Guide to Recorded Classical Music, 2008, gave its maximum four star rating to none of the recordings of the concerto. It awarded three stars (representing "an outstanding performance and recording") to the recordings by Graffin, Heifetz, Kang, Kennedy (1984 and 1997), Menuhin (1932 and 1966), and Sammons (1929).

Notes

References
March, Ivan (ed). The Penguin Guide to Recorded Classical Music, Penguin Books, London, 2007. 

Discographies of classical compositions
Violin Concerto discography